Lanzamex Atlixco' is a Mexican football club that plays in the Tercera División de México. The club is based in Atlixco, Puebla and was founded in 2009.

See also
Football in Mexico
Atlixco
Tercera División de México

External links
Tercera Divicion

References 

Football clubs in Puebla
Association football clubs established in 2009
2009 establishments in Mexico